Lyces constricta is a moth of the family Notodontidae first described by William Warren in 1901. It is found in the Atlantic coastal forest of Brazil from Bahia to Rio Grande do Sul.

External links
Species page at Tree of Life Web Project

Notodontidae
Moths described in 1901